The LETAS Grand Finale was a women's professional golf tournament played as the season finale of the LET Access Series, held first in 2019 in France.

The inaugural tournament was held in 2019 at Golf Club de La Largue in Mooslargue, France as the Road To La Largue Final. With a purse of €80,000 it was the richest on LETAS to date (excluding dual-ranking events with the Ladies European Tour). Overnight leader Niina Liias clinched the title  in a playoff against Magdalena Simmermacher. Liias secured her maiden professional victory with a birdie on the 365-yard par four 9th thanks to an eight iron approach that left her a short putt for the win.

2020 and 2021 saw pandemic schedule disruptions but the event was scheduled to return in 2022, now held at L'Isle Adam near Paris. The 2022 tournament was eventually removed from the schedule. The tournament was dropped from the 2023 schedule.

The 2022 tournament was to feature the top 50 players in the Order of Merit along with 10 invitees.

Winners

References

External links

LET Access Series events
Golf tournaments in France
2019 establishments in France
2022 establishments in France